Kwamena Duncan is a Ghanaian educationist and politician. He is a member of the New Patriotic Party in Ghana. He is the Central Regional minister of Ghana. He was appointed by President Nana Addo Danquah Akuffo-Addo in January 2017 and was approved by the Members of Parliament in February 2017. He is also former Central Regional Secretary of the New Patriotic Party

References

Living people
New Patriotic Party politicians
Central Region (Ghana)
Ghanaian educators
Mfantsipim School alumni
People from Central Region (Ghana)
Year of birth missing (living people)